The Group III tournament was held April 3–7, in San Salvador, El Salvador, on outdoor clay courts.

Format
The eight teams were split into two groups and played in a round-robin format. The top two teams of each group advanced to the promotion pool, from which the two top teams were promoted to the Americas Zone Group II in 2003. The bottom two teams of each group were placed in the relegation pool, from which the two bottom teams were demoted to the Americas Zone Group IV in 2003.

Pool A

Results of Individual Ties

Pool B

Results of Individual Ties

Promotion pool
The top two teams from each of Pools A and B advanced to the Promotion pool. Results and points from games against the opponent from the preliminary round were carried forward.

Results of Individual Ties

Dominican Republic and Haiti promoted to Group II for 2003.

Relegation pool
The bottom two teams from Pools A and B were placed in the relegation group.  Results and points from games against the opponent from the preliminary round were carried forward.

Results of Individual Ties

Costa Rica and Panama demoted to Group IV for 2003.

References

2002 Davis Cup Americas Zone
Davis Cup Americas Zone